Cylindropuntia ramosissima is a species of cactus known by the common names diamond cholla and branched pencil cholla.

Distribution
Cylindropuntia ramosissima is native to the Mojave and Sonoran Deserts of the Southwestern United States, California, and Northwestern Mexico, and to Baja California and its Islas San Benito.

Description
Cylindropuntia ramosissima is a decumbent or erect and treelike cactus which can approach 2 meters-6 feet in maximum height. It has many narrow branches made up of cylindrical segments, green in color drying gray, the surface divided into squarish, flat tubercles with few or no spines, or often with a single long, straight spine.

The flower is small and orange, pink or brownish in color. The fruit is a small, dry, spiny body up to 2 centimeters long.

Cylindropuntia ramosissima is a host to several species of moths, most notably the Sphinx Moth.

External links
Cylindropuntia ramosissima photo gallery at Cholla Web
Jepson Manual Treatment:  Cylindropuntia ramosissima
Flora of North America: Cylindropuntia ramosissima
Cylindropuntia ramosissima Photo gallery

ramosissima
Cacti of Mexico
Cacti of the United States
Flora of the California desert regions
Flora of the Sonoran Deserts
Flora of California
Flora of Baja California
Flora of Arizona
Flora of Sonora
Natural history of the Colorado Desert
Natural history of the Mojave Desert
Flora without expected TNC conservation status